Rıdvan Öncel (born February 21, 1997) is a Turkish professional basketball player for Türk Telekom of the Turkish Basketbol Süper Ligi (BSL), who plays as a point guard.

References

External links
Basketball Champions League profile
TBLStat.net Profile
Eurobasket profile
TBL profile

1997 births
Living people
Bahçeşehir Koleji S.K. players
Bandırma B.İ.K. players
Galatasaray S.K. (men's basketball) players
Shooting guards
Turkish men's basketball players